Robert James Anderson (February 25, 1899 – January 24, 1975) was an American baseball second baseman in the Negro leagues. He played with the Chicago Giants in 1920.

References

External links
 and Baseball-Reference Black Baseball Stats and  Seamheads

Chicago Giants players
1899 births
1975 deaths
Baseball players from Chicago
Baseball second basemen
20th-century African-American sportspeople